Manuel Ramos was an Argentine footballer, who played as forward in Club Atlético Independiente. He played the first final of professionalism against River Plate.

In 1932, he was incorporated into the Independiente team together with Atilio Maccarone, Emilio Almiñana and Fermín Lecea. This team had consecrated figures as Antonio Sastre and Manuel Seoane.

References

External links 
www.rsssf.com

Argentine footballers
Footballers from Buenos Aires
Club Atlético Independiente footballers
Argentine sportspeople of Spanish descent
Sportspeople from Avellaneda
Association football forwards
Year of birth missing
Year of death missing